The Umtiza Nature Reserve is one of two forest nature reserves in the greater East London Coast Nature Reserve. It is named after Umtiza listeriana, a rare and protected legume found within the reserve. The Buffalo River borders the northern part of the reserve, and includes the remaining Umtiza Forest on the southern banks of the river. The Buffalo Pass traverses the entirety of the reserve and the surrounding Controlled Forest Area.

History 
The Fort Grey State forest which is found south of the current reserve, was proclaimed a protected forest prior to the Union of South Africa. In 2020, an area of  surrounding the reserve, which include the Grey Dell and Fort Grey forest areas, and private farmland, were declared a Controlled Forest Area to prevent deforestation and rehabilitate the remaining Umtiza Forest.

Biodiversity 
A variety of wildlife is found within the reserve.

Birds 
There are 30-40 bird species in the reserve, including:

 African dusky flycatcher
 African finfoot 
 Brown scrub robin
 Knysna woodpecker
 Narina trogon
 Lemon dove
 Yellow-throated woodland warbler

Mammals 
Samango monkeys along with bushbuck, common duiker, blue duiker, tree dassies and porcupines can be found in the reserve.

Vegetation 

The reserve is one of the last refuges of the vulnerable Umtiza listeriana.

See also 

 List of protected areas of South Africa

References 

Eastern Cape Provincial Parks
Nature reserves in South Africa